von Baeyer is a lunar impact crater located on the lunar near side near the southern pole. The crater is located directly adjacent to Svedberg crater and Northeast and South of prominent craters Scott and Demonax, respectively. Baeyer was adopted and named after German chemist Adolf von Baeyer by the IAU in 2009.

References

External links 
 LAC-144 area — Map of southern lunar pole

Impact craters on the Moon